Imen Ben Mrad (born 8 February 1992), known as Imen Mrad, is a Tunisian footballer who plays as a midfielder. She has been a member of the Tunisia women's national team.

Club career
Mrad has played for Kireçburnu Spor in Turkey.

International career
Mrad capped for Tunisia at senior level during two Africa Women Cup of Nations qualifications (2014 and 2016).

See also
List of Tunisia women's international footballers

References

External links

1992 births
Living people
People from Sousse
Tunisian women's footballers
Women's association football midfielders
Kireçburnu Spor players
Turkish Women's Football Super League players
Tunisia women's international footballers
Tunisian expatriate footballers
Tunisian expatriate sportspeople in Turkey
Expatriate women's footballers in Turkey
20th-century Tunisian women
21st-century Tunisian women